The term used in the Royal Air Force (RAF) to refer to all ranks below commissioned officer level is other ranks (ORs). It includes warrant officers (WOs), non-commissioned officers (NCOs) and airmen.


Ranks

Origins 
Upon the formation of the Royal Air Force on 1 April 1918, rank titles and badges for ORs were adopted from the British Army, specifically the Royal Flying Corps (RFC). The RFC ranks of Flight Sergeant (equivalent to Staff Sergeant), Sergeant, Corporal and Air Mechanic were directly adopted. The RFC's four-bladed propeller trade classification badge above the Sergeants' and Flight Sergeants' chevrons was dropped.

To distinguish them from Army personnel, RAF personnel wore the RAF Eagle on a rectangular patch below the shoulder seam on the sleeve. The RAF Eagle is depicted with its beak turned to the rear rather than the front. RAF NCOs were fond of saying that represented that their eyes were everywhere.

The trade classification of Leading Aircraftman was created on 5 April 1918 to fill a void in the Service ranks. It was granted the double-bladed propeller rank insignia of the RFC Air Mechanic 1st Class and was equivalent in rank and authority to the Army appointment of Lance-Corporal. On 1 January 1919 the rank of Aircraftman replaced the ranks of Private, Air Mechanic, and Clerk. Aircraftmen were nicknamed "Erks" (a corruption of the word 'Aircraft') by the senior ranks, which was preferred to 'other ranks' or 'troops'.

The rank of Master Clerk was originally equivalent to Sergeant Major 1st Class. On 28 November 1918, the new rank of Chief Master Clerk was made equivalent to the rank of Sergeant Major 1st Class, and the old rank of Master Clerk was made equivalent to the rank of Sergeant Major 2nd Class.

The original RAF ranks are vertically listed by seniority; the Technical ranks had precedence over the Administrative ranks, which in turn had precedence over the Service ranks. This was meant to keep non-technical NCOs from interfering with the efforts of technical and administrative NCOs. This was abolished in January 1919 and a streamlined single-column rank system was devised.

1930–1949

Warrant officers 
In 1933, the ranks of Sergeant Major 1st Class and Sergeant Major 2nd Class were renamed Warrant Officer Class I and Warrant Officer Class II to put them in line with the Army. In 1939, the rank of Warrant Officer II was abolished and the rank of Warrant Officer I was renamed Warrant Officer. RAF Warrant Officers were given equivalent status to the continuing Army rank of Warrant Officer Class I.

Aircrew 
On 1 July 1946, NCOs serving as aircrew were assigned different rank badges which distinguished them from ORs in ground trades. The new ranks were:

The RAF Eagle in the insignia is properly displayed with its beak turned to the rear.

1950s

Technicians and aircrew 
In 1950, a new grading system for technicians was introduced. This involved the creation of the following ranks:

Also in 1950, the unpopular NCO aircrew ranks were abolished, although Master Aircrew was retained as a rank. Aircrew I became Flight Sergeant Aircrew and Aircrew II, III and IV became Sergeant Aircrew. Both new ranks adopted a gold RAF Eagle between the chevrons to permit continuing distinction from ground trades. Aircrew cadets wore the RAF Eagle on its own as a trade classification badge.

Junior ranks 
On 1 January 1951, two junior ranks were introduced:
 Senior Aircraftman/Senior Aircraftwoman with a triple-bladed propeller.
 Leading Aircraftman/Leading Aircraftwoman with a double-bladed propeller (this had previously been only a trade classification and not a rank)

1960s

Technicians 
In 1964, the technician ranks were abolished, with the exception of Junior Technician and Chief Technician, the latter becoming an intermediate rank between Sergeant and Flight Sergeant for Technical Trades. Junior Technicians adopted the four-bladed propeller as their badge of rank and Chief Technicians adopted a treble chevron surmounted by a four-bladed propeller as their rank insignia. Master Technicians, Senior Technicians and Corporal Technicians became Warrant Officer, Sergeant and Corporal respectively. The ORs structure became:
 Warrant Officer (WO) / Master Aircrew (MAcr)
 Flight Sergeant (Flt Sgt, F/Sgt, or FS) / Flight Sergeant Aircrew (FSAcr)
 Chief Technician (Chf Tech, C/T, or CT)
 Sergeant (Sgt) / Sergeant Aircrew (SAcr)
 Corporal (Cpl)
 Junior Technician (Jnr Tech, J/T, or JT)
 Senior Aircraftman (SAC) / Senior Aircraftwoman (SACW)
 Leading Aircraftman (LAC) / Leading Aircraftwoman (LACW)
 Aircraftman (AC) / Aircraftwoman (ACW)

Changes in the 2000s

Phasing out of Junior Technician 
From 2005 onwards, no more airmen have been promoted to Junior Technician. Although there are currently personnel in the rank of Junior Technician, once they have all been promoted or discharged from the RAF, the rank will cease to be used. From March 2005, SACs in technical trades who had attained the Operational Performance Standard were promoted to Senior Aircraftman/Aircraftwoman (Technician) SAC(T) and given a new badge of rank, consisting of the three-bladed propeller inside a circle. This new rank was introduced to distinguish airmen trained to work unsupervised from those who were not, and is equivalent to the old Junior Technician rank.

Introduction of Lance Corporal 
On 1 April 2010, the RAF Regiment introduced the rank of lance corporal for SACs at the time who undertook the role of section second-in-command/fire team commander. This gave them more authority on the ground, as well as a better pay band. The rank has not moved to other trades, and is solely in the RAF Regiment.

Aviator replaces Airman/Airwoman 
In November 2021 the official RAF magazine AirClues promulgated: "the term ‘aviator’ has now replaced the generic term of ‘airman’ to bring right up to date the way we should describe all of our personnel," since women now numbered a fifth of candidates applying to enlist in the RAF.

Air Specialist replaces Airman/Airwoman 
In July 2022, the RAF officially introduced the ranks Air recruit, Air specialist class 2, Air specialist class 1 and Air specialist (class 1) technician to replace the ranks Aircraftman/woman, Leading Aircraftman/woman, Senior Aircraftman/woman and Senior Aircraftman/woman (Technician). This was an attempt to further promote gender neutrality and inclusion with the RAF.

Timeline of changes 

Aircrew

See also 
 Aircrew brevet
 British Army Other Ranks rank insignia
 Comparative military ranks of World War I
 Comparative military ranks of World War II
 Comparative military ranks
 List of Royal Air Force ground trades
 List of Royal Air Force members
 Military rank
 RAF officer ranks
 Ranks and insignia of NATO Air Forces Enlisted
 Ranks of the cadet forces of the United Kingdom
 Royal Navy ratings rank insignia
 Royal Observer Corps ranks
 Women's Auxiliary Air Force ranks

References

External links 
Ranks and Badges of the Royal Air Force
RAF ORs and equivalents, reproduced from Air Ministry Weekly Order 109 of 1921

Air force ranks
British military insignia